Bellu may refer to:
 Bellu Cemetery, a famous cemetery in Bucharest, Romania
 Barbu Bellu (1825–1900), Romanian nobleman and politician
 Octavian Bellu (born 1951), Romanian sports coach

See also 
 Belu (disambiguation)
 Bello (disambiguation)